Anthony Drawhorn (born July 27, 1965) was a football player in the Canadian Football League for ten years. Drawhorn played as a cornerback, halfback, and free safety for five different teams. He was a CFL All-Star five times. He played college football at UNLV.
Drawhorn has 5 children.

References

1965 births
Living people
American players of Canadian football
BC Lions players
Birmingham Barracudas players
Canadian football defensive backs
Canadian football return specialists
Cerritos Falcons football players
Montreal Alouettes players
Ottawa Rough Riders players
Saskatchewan Roughriders players
UNLV Rebels football players
Players of American football from Los Angeles
Players of Canadian football from Los Angeles